Bijay Mohanty (8 April 1950 – 20 July 2020) was an Indian actor in Odia Cinema. He was honored a National Film Award.

Personal life
Early life
Mohanty was born in 1950 at Pandiri, Kendrapara and brought up in Baripada, Mayurbhanj, Odisha. He started acting during his school days while studying at M.K.C High School. After his graduation with BA, he joined the National School of Drama. He passed successfully from the NSD with classmates like Naseeruddin Shah, Raj Babbar, and Om Puri etc. He acted in the theatres and stayed in Delhi up to 1975. After returning to Odisha, he devoted himself to directing plays.

Married life
Bijay was married to Tandra Ray, an actress in the Odia film industry. The couple acted in a number of films opposite each other. They have one daughter.

Career
In 1977, Mohanty started upon his career in the Oriya film industry with the film Chilika Tire which won the National Award for that year. Initially, he opted mostly for negative roles. Naga Phasa, Samay Bada Balaban, Danda Balunga, Sahari Bagha, Chaka Bhaunri, and Chaka Akhi Sabu Dekhuchi are some of his most notable films as this type of character. He acted in almost every manner of roles available to him; ranging from hero, villain, and comedian to character roles etc. In every field he left his incomparable mark. Mohanty's other notable films include; Arati (1981), Mamata Mage Mula (1985), Aei Aama Sansara (1986), Aama Ghara Aama Sansara (1991), Ki Heba Sua Posile, Bhisma Pratigya (1993), Bhai Hela Bhagari (1994), Suna Panjuri, Laxman Rekha, Rakhi Bhijigala Akhi Luhare and I Love My India.

He also directed the movie Bhuli Huena.

He joined the Drama department of the Utkal Sangeet Mahavidyalaya in 1977 and retired as a professor from the institute in recent years.

Jugechha, a drama troupe that he formed in his native place of Baripada was a well-known troupe and staged plays in different parts of Odisha as well as throughout the country.

Some of his television serials aired on Doordarshan include; Asara Aloka, Sri Jagannath, Subhadra, Sara Akasa, Samaya Chaka, Sakalara Apekhya Re, Nadekhile Loka Dekhe, Mahayagyan and Bidhatara Khela.

Political career
Mohanty joined Indian National Congress on 27 February 2014. He stood for election to become a member of Parliament from Bhubaneswar Lok Sabha seat in 2014 Indian general elections and was defeated. Recently he declared his resignation from Congress citing that he was not actively involved in politics after the 2014 general elections.

Death 
Mohanty died in Care Hospital at the age of 70 on 20 July 2020 evening in Bhubaneswar. After his condition deteriorated in the evening, he was rushed to Care Hospitals. He, however, died while undergoing treatment.

Awards and honours
 Chilika teeray - National Film Awards (1978) - Certificate of merit for best Odia film.
 Jayadev Award - 2014 (Odisha State Film Awards).
 He was honoured with National Award for his contribution to art and literature.
 Won the Odisha State Film Awards six times for Arati (1981), Mamata Mage Mula (1985), Ei Aam Sansara (1986), Aam Ghara Aam Sansara (1991), Bhisma Pratingya (1993) and Bhai Hela Bhagari (1994).
Orissa Cine Critics Award in 1987 for "Best Actor of the Decade".

Filmography

 Golmaal Love (2019)
 Selfish Dil (2019)
 Mita Basichi Mu Bhuta Sathire (2013)
 Daha Balunga (2013)
 Hata Dhari Chaluthaa (2013)
 Chhatire Lekhichi Tori Naa (2011)
 Om Namaha Shivaya (2010)
 Megha Sabari Re Asiba Pheri (2010)
 Prema Adhei Akshyara (2010)
 Dil Tate Deichi (2010)
 Mu Kana Ete Kharap (2010)
 Don (2010)
 Tu Thile Mo Dara Kahaku (2010)
 Love Dot Com (2009)
 Romeo: The Lover Boy (2009)
 Mukhyamantri (2009)
 Shatru Sanghar (2009)
 Dream Girl (2009)
 Satya Meba Jayate (2008)
 Mate Ta Love Helare (2008)
 Kalinga Putra (2008)
 Lal Tuku Tuku Sadhaba Bahu (2007)
 Kali Sankar (2007)
 Chaka Chaka Bhaunri (2007)
 To Pain Nebi Mu Sahe Janama (2007)
 Mahanayak (2007)
 Mo Suna Pua (2007)
 Mu Tate Love Karuchi (2007)
 Nari Akhire Nian (2007)
 Nari Nuhen Tu Narayani (2007)
 I Love My India (2006)
 Rakate Lekhichi Naa (2006)
 Tu Mo Manara Mita (2006)
 Tate Mo Rana (2005)
 Priya Mo Priya (2005)
 Agni Parikshya (2005)
 Babu I Love You (2005)
 Dharma Ra Heba Jay (2005)
 I Love You (2005)
 Prema Rutu Aslilare (2005)
 Tu Mo Akhira Tara (2005)
 Je Panche Para Manda (2003)
 Katha Deithili Maa Ku (2003)
 Sabata Maa (2003)
 Ziddi (2003)
 Sindura Nuhein Khela Ghara (2002)
 Dharma Sahile Hela (2002)
 Maa Kande Aaji Puate Pain (2002)
 Maa Mangala (2002)
 Rahichi Rahibi Tori Paain (2002)
 Baazi (2001)
 Dharma Debata (2001)
 Mo Kola To Jhulana (2001)
 To Akhi Mo Aina (1999)
 Pua Mora Jagata Jita (1997)
 Sakhi Rahila Ae Singha Duara (1994)
 Kula Nandan (1995)
 Mo Mana Khali Tori Pain (1995)
 Samaya Chakare Sansara Ratha (2000)
 Maha Sangram (2000)
 Kasia Kapila (2000)
 Sahara Jaluchi (2000)
 Rakata Chinhichhi Nijara Kie (1999)
 Janmadata (1999)
 Kie Pochhiba Maa Akhira Luha (1999)
 Mana Rahigala Tumarithare (1999)
 Bou (1998)
 Babu Parashuram (1998)
 Laxmi Pratima (1998)
 Ram Laxman (1997)
 Savitri (1997)
 Jibana sathi (1997)
 Kie Kahara (1997)
 Katha Rahigala Kala Kala Ku (1997)
 Rakhi Bhijigala Aakhi Luha Re (1997)
 Sasu Hathakadi Bhauja Bedi (1997)
 Laxman Rekha (1996)
 Vasudha (1996)
 Sakhi Rakhiba Mo Shankha Sindura (1996)
 Suna Panjuri (1995)
 Pacheri Uthila Majhi Duaru (1994)
 Lakshe Shiva Puji Paichi Pua (1994)
 Gopare Badhuchi Kala Kanhei (1994)
 Bhai Hela Bhagari (1994)
 Bhagya Hate Dori (1993)
 Pathara Khasuchi Bada Deulu (1993)
 Anti Churi Tanti Kate (1992)
 Bhisma Pratigyan (1992)
 Naga Panchami (1992)
 Panjuri Bhitare Sari (1992)
 Ghara Mora Swarga (1992)
 Ki Heba Sua Posile (1991)
 Kotia Manish Gotiye Jaga (1991)
 Ama Ghara Ama Sansara (1990)
 Bastra Harana (1990)
 Thakura Achanti Chau Bahaku (1990)
 Ei Sangharsh (1990)
 Chakadola Karuchi Leela (1990)
 Hasa Luha Bhara Diniya (1990)
 Daiba Daudi (1990)
 Maa Mate Shakti De (1990)
 Bidhira Bidhan (1989)
 Asuchi Mo Kalia Suna (1989)
 Sasti (1989)
 Pratisodha Aparadh Nuhen (1989)
 Chaka Aakhi Sabu Dekhuchi (1989)
 Mamata Ra Dori (1989)
 Sagar (1989)
 Michha Maya Sansar (1989)
 Jahaku Rakhibe Ananta (1988)
 Pua Moro Kala Thakura (1988)
 Bada Bhauja (1988)
 Kasturi (1987)
 Suna Chadhei (1987)
 Thili Jhia Heli Bohu (1987)
 Basanti Apa (1987)
 Tunda Baida (1987)
 Eai Ta Dunia (1987)
 Bhuli Huena (1987)
 Chha Mana Atha Guntha (1986)
 Manika (1986)
 Sanskar (1986)
 Chaka Bhaunri (1985)
 Ei Aama Sansar (1985)
 Sata Kebe Luchi Rahena (1985)
 Mamata Mage Mula (1985)
 Sahari Bagha (1985)
 Hakim Babu (1985)
 Sankha Sindura (1985)
 Pooja Phula (1985)
 Jaga Hatare Pagha (1985)
 Para Jhia Ghara Bhangena (1985)
 Jai Phula (1984)
 Kaberi (1984)
 Janani (1984)
 Jeevan Sangram (1984)
 Dora (1984)
 Danda Balunga (1984)
 Swapna Sagara (1983)
 Ram Rahim (1983)
 Astarag (1982)
 Samaya Bada Balaban (1982)
 Tike Hasa Tike Luha (1981)
 Arati (1981)
 Kie Jite Kie Hare (1981)
 Sautuni (1979)
 Pati Patni (1978)
 Samarpana (1978)
 Pipasa (1978)
 Chilika Teerey (1977)
 Suna Sansar (1978)
 Naga Phasa (1977)

References

External links
 
Bijay Mohanty Website

Male actors in Odia cinema
Ollywood
Male actors from Odisha
1950 births
2020 deaths